Nurkeyevo (Nörkäy) is a rural locality (a village) in Subkhankulovsky Selsoviet, Tuymazinsky District, Bashkortostan, Russia. The population was 888 as of 2010. There are 18 streets.

Geography 
Nurkeyevo is located 8 km southeast of Tuymazy (the district's administrative centre) by road. Staroye Subkhankulovo is the nearest rural locality.

References 

Rural localities in Tuymazinsky District